Sivan Levy (born 4 June 1987) is an Israeli singer-songwriter, filmmaker, and actress.

Early life

After graduating from Israel's Alon School of the Arts in 2007, Levy began her military service as a singer for the IDF Musical Ensemble.

Career

Following the completion of her military service in 2009, Sivan was cast in her first film, Burning Mooki, directed by Lena and Slava Chaplin.  In 2011, she starred in Veronika Kedar's feature film Joe and Belle, and appears in Invisible,
directed by Michal Aviad and starring Ronit Elkabetz.

In 2012, Sivan starred in the film 6 acts, directed by Jonathan Gurfinkel, for which she received numerous awards including the Haifa International festival Best Actress Award, The Israeli Academy Award for Best leading Actress 2013 and the Israeli critic award for 2013. Levy also plays the french speaking role of 'Ava"   in the feature film Inch’Allah, a Canadian-French film, directed by Anaïs Barbeau-Lavalette.

Levy began working in television in 2009, when she joined the cast of the renowned primetime TV series Imalle on Channel 2, directed by Ram Nehari. Later that year she appeared in Room Service, directed by Eitan Aner, and in 2010, Sivan reunited with directors Lena and Slava Chaplin, starring in the Israeli TV film In the Prime of Her Life, a modern adaptation of the works of Israeli author Shai Agnon.  Sivan also appears in the TV series Yechefilm, directed by Ori Sivan and 'House of Wishes, directed by Haim Bouzaglo (2013)

Levy has created and starred in well-received short films. Cherchez la femme (2008), which Levy co-directed with Eyal Bromberg, was featured on ARTE, presented at the Tel Aviv arts museum and selected for the Berlinale in 2009 via the "Fucking Different Tel Aviv" special project. Water Wells (2010), for which she composed an entirely original soundtrack, received worldwide festival exposure including Sundance's 'Outfest'. Sivan directed her third film, Dina & Noel'' alongside Natalie Melamed, composed the soundtrack with Gil Lewis and starred opposite Glenn T. Perocho, competed at the 63rd Berlin International Film Festival, in The Generation 14 plus section.

Levy is currently working on her debut album, to be recorded in English.

Film and television credits

Awards and nominations

References

External links

Sivan Levy on FACEBOOK

Sivan Levy on YouTube

1987 births
Living people
21st-century Israeli women singers
People from Ramat HaSharon
Israeli film actresses
Israeli television actresses
Israeli film directors
Jewish Israeli actresses
Jewish Israeli musicians